The women's shot put at the 2022 European Athletics Championships took place at the Olympiastadion on 15 August.

Records

Schedule

Results

Qualification

Qualification: 18.60 m (Q) or best 12 performers (q)

Final
The final was started on 15 August at 20:38.

References

Shot Put
Shot put at the European Athletics Championships
Euro